The list of records in the Deutsche Tourenwagen Masters includes records and statistics set in the DTM and ITC. The competition started as the Deutsche Tourenwagen Meisterschaft (DTM) in 1984. In 1995 the competition expanded and was split between a domestic season and the new FIA International Touring Car Series. The following year the DTM went on hiatus but the ITC only lasted one season before being cancelled. In 2000 the revived series Deutsche Tourenwagen Masters began.

Drivers

Wins

Statistics

Constructors

Champions

Statistics
As of Round 8 of the 2022 season (Wins till 2022 season).

References
History at DTM
Statistics at DTM

Records
Auto racing lists
Auto racing records